"Turn! Turn! Turn!", also known as or subtitled "To Everything There Is a Season", is a song written by Pete Seeger in 1959. The lyrics – except for the title, which is repeated throughout the song, and the final two lines – consist of the first eight verses of the third chapter of the biblical Book of Ecclesiastes. The song was originally released in 1962 as "To Everything There Is a Season" on the folk group the Limeliters' album Folk Matinee, and then some months later on Seeger's own The Bitter and the Sweet.

The song became an international hit in late 1965 when it was adapted by the American folk rock group the Byrds. The single entered the U.S. chart at number 80 on October 23, 1965, before reaching number one on the Billboard Hot 100 chart on December 4, 1965. In Canada, it reached number 3 on November 29, 1965, and also peaked at number 26 on the UK Singles Chart.

Lyrics
The lyrics are taken almost verbatim from the book of Ecclesiastes, as found in the King James Version (1611) of the Bible, though the sequence of the words was rearranged for the song. Ecclesiastes is traditionally ascribed to King Solomon who would have written it in the 10th century BC, but believed by a significant group of biblical scholars to date much later, up to the third century BC:

The Biblical text posits there being a time and place for all things: birth and death, killing and healing, sorrow and laughter, war and peace, and so on. The lines are open to myriad interpretations, but Seeger's song presents them as a plea for world peace with the closing line: "a time for peace, I swear it's not too late." This line and the title phrase "Turn! Turn! Turn!" are the only parts of the lyric written by Seeger himself.

In 1999, Seeger arranged for 45% of the songwriting royalties for "Turn! Turn! Turn!" to be donated to the Israeli Committee Against House Demolitions. He kept 50% of the royalties for his own music and took a further 5% for the lyrics because, in Seeger's own words, "[in addition to the music] I did write six words and one more word repeated three times." Seeger's handwritten lyrics to the song were among documents donated to New York University by the Communist Party USA in March 2007.

The song is notable for being one of a few instances in popular music in which a large portion of the Bible is set to music, other examples being the Melodians' (and Boney M's) "Rivers of Babylon",  Sister Janet Mead's "The Lord's Prayer", U2's "40", Sinead O'Connor's "Psalm 33" and Cliff Richard's "The Millennium Prayer". Since Ecclesiastes is traditionally ascribed to King Solomon in the 10th century BC, the Byrds' 1965 recording of the song holds the distinction in the U.S. of being the number 1 hit with the oldest lyrics.

The song was published in illustrated book form by Simon & Schuster in September 2003, with an accompanying CD which contained both Seeger's and the Byrds' recordings of the song. Wendy Anderson Halperin created a set of detailed illustrations for each set of opposites which are reminiscent of mandalas. The book also includes the Ecclesiastes text from the King James version of the Bible.

Renditions

Early folk versions
The song was first released by the folk group the Limeliters on their 1962 album Folk Matinee, under the title "To Everything There Is a Season". The Limeliters' version predated the release of Seeger's own version by several months. One of the Limeliters' backing musicians at this time was Jim McGuinn (aka Roger McGuinn), who would later record the song with his band the Byrds and, prior to that, arrange the song for folk singer Judy Collins on her 1963 album, Judy Collins 3. Collins' recording of the song was retitled as "Turn! Turn! Turn! (To Everything There Is a Season)", a title that would be retained by the Byrds, though it was shortened to "Turn! Turn! Turn!" on the front cover of the album of the same name and the song became generally known by the shorter version, appearing as such on most later Byrds compilations.

In 1963 Marlene Dietrich recorded "Für alles kommt die Zeit (Glaub', Glaub)", Max Colpet's German translation of the song. Dietrich was backed by a Burt Bacharach conducted studio orchestra, and the song was released as a single. Australian folk singer Gary Shearston also recorded a version of the song for his 1964 album Songs of Our Time, with the title "Turn! Turn! Turn! (To Everything There Is a Season)".

The Byrds' version

"Turn! Turn! Turn!" was adapted by the Byrds in a folk rock arrangement and released as a single by Columbia Records on October 1, 1965. The song was also included on the band's second album, Turn! Turn! Turn!, which was released on December 6, 1965. The Byrds' single is the most successful recorded version of the song, having reached number 1 on the US Billboard Hot 100 charts and number 26 on the UK Singles Chart. The B-side of the single was band member Gene Clark's original composition, "She Don't Care About Time".

"Turn! Turn! Turn!" had first been arranged by the Byrds' lead guitarist Jim McGuinn in a chamber-folk style during sessions for Judy Collins' 1963 album, Judy Collins 3. The idea of reviving the song came to McGuinn during the Byrds' July 1965 tour of the American Midwest, when his future wife, Dolores, requested the tune on the Byrds' tour bus. The rendering that McGuinn dutifully played came out sounding not like a folk song but more like a rock/folk hybrid, perfectly in keeping with the Byrds' status as pioneers of the folk rock genre. McGuinn explained, "It was a standard folk song by that time, but I played it and it came out rock 'n' roll because that's what I was programmed to do like a computer. I couldn't do it as it was traditionally. It came out with that samba beat, and we thought it would make a good single." The master recording of the song reportedly took the Byrds 78 takes, spread over five days of recording, to complete.

Music journalist William Ruhlmann has pointed out that the song's plea for peace and tolerance struck a nerve with the American record buying public as the Vietnam War escalated. The single also solidified folk rock as a chart trend and, like the band's previous hits, continued the Byrds' successful mix of vocal harmony and jangly twelve-string Rickenbacker guitar playing. Billboard described the song as a "fascinating entry with words from the Book of Ecclesiastes and music adapted by Pete Seeger" that is "performed with respect and taste and a solid dance beat backing."  Cash Box described it as a "tip-top version" of Seeger's original and said that the Byrds read "the lyrical folk item in an appropriate emotion-packed style."  Pete Seeger expressed his approval of the Byrds' rendering of the song.

During 1965 and 1966, the band performed the song on the television programs Hollywood A Go-Go, Shindig!, The Ed Sullivan Show, and Where the Action Is, as well as in the concert film, The Big T.N.T. Show. Additionally, the song would go on to become a staple of the Byrds' live concert repertoire, until their final disbandment in 1973. The song was also performed live by a reformed line-up of the Byrds featuring Roger McGuinn, David Crosby and Chris Hillman in January 1989. In addition to its appearance on the Turn! Turn! Turn! album, the song also appears on several Byrds' compilations, including The Byrds' Greatest Hits, History of The Byrds, The Original Singles: 1965–1967, Volume 1, The Byrds, 20 Essential Tracks From The Boxed Set: 1965-1990, The Very Best of The Byrds, The Essential Byrds and There Is a Season.

The recording has been featured in numerous movies and TV shows, including 1983's Heart Like a Wheel, 1994's Forrest Gump, and 2002's In America. Following Joe Cocker's cover of "With a Little Help from My Friends", the song was the first to be played in the initial episode of the television series The Wonder Years. It was also used in a Wonder Years parody, during The Simpsons episode "Three Men and a Comic Book". In 2003, it was used in the closing sequence of the Cold Case episode "A Time to Hate" (Season One, episode 7) and for the closing credits of episode 3 of Ken Burns and Lynn Novick's 2017 documentary The Vietnam War.

Personnel
Jim McGuinn – 12-string lead guitar, lead vocals
Gene Clark – tambourine, harmony vocals
David Crosby – rhythm guitar, harmony vocals
Chris Hillman – electric bass
Michael Clarke – drums

Chart history

Weekly charts
The Byrds

Judy Collins

Year-end charts

Other cover versions
The song has been covered by many other artists:
 The Seekers recorded it in 1966 for their Come the Day album. A video was also recorded for the song.
 Mary Hopkin won the television talent show Opportunity Knocks in 1968 singing her cover of the song. She recorded it as the B-side to her debut single "Those Were the Days", also in 1968. She also recorded a Welsh-language version of the song: "Tro, tro, tro".
 Judy Collins covered the song in 1969.  It became a Top 40 hit in Canada and on the U.S. Easy Listening chart.
 Nina Simone covered the song on her 1969 album To Love Somebody.
 Scottish singer Sheila Walsh recorded the song in 1983 for her album War of love. It was released that year as a single, produced by Cliff Richard and Craig Pruess.
 Country singer Vern Gosdin covered the song as a duet with Roger McGuinn (of The Byrds) on his 1984 There Is a Season album.
 Dolly Parton recorded it in 1984 for her The Great Pretender album, and again in 2005 for Those Were the Days; on Parton's 2005 recording of the song, she was joined by McGuinn, who played guitar and provided harmony vocals.
 Wilson Phillips covered the song in 2003 on their California album. 
 McGuinn, Parton, Marty Stuart, and Kathy Mattea performed the song together in the 2003 movie Our Country.
 Slovak singer Laco Lucenic covered the song in 2004 release Satisfactory. 
 Adrienne Camp covered the song in 2006 on her album Don't Wait.
 Chris De Burgh covered the song on his 2008 album Footsteps.
 McGuinn, Emmylou Harris, and Ricky Skaggs cut a new version for the soundtrack and ending credits of the 2014 film, The Song.
 Norwegian singer Kari Rueslåtten covered the song as "Turn, Turn, Turn" and released it as the lead single for her 2015 album To the North. A video was also recorded for the song.
 Resgate (Rescue), a Christian rock band from Brazil, covered the song, in their 2017 album No Seu Quintal (In Your Backyard).

See also
List of anti-war songs

Notes

References

External links
 Ecclesiastes Chapter 3 King James Version
 

1962 songs
1965 singles
Pete Seeger songs
Billboard Hot 100 number-one singles
Cashbox number-one singles
Number-one singles in New Zealand
Judy Collins songs
The Byrds songs
Jan and Dean songs
Dolly Parton songs
Jim Witter songs
Nina Simone songs
Anti-war songs
Songs written by Pete Seeger
Songs based on the Bible
Columbia Records singles
Song recordings produced by Terry Melcher
Ecclesiastes